Mordellistena charagolensis is a beetle in the genus Mordellistena of the family Mordellidae. It was described in 1964 by Ermisch.

References

charagolensis
Beetles described in 1964